Luhanka (also ) is a municipality of Finland. It is located in the Central Finland region. In relation to its population Luhanka is not just the smallest municipality in the region but also smallest in the whole Mainland Finland.

There are also many summertime cottages in Luhanka.

The municipality is unilingually Finnish. The municipality is also been known as "" in Swedish documents.

Mimicking the badger in the coat of arms of Luhanka, the permanent residents include the official animal mascot of the municipality, Sisu the Badger (Sisu-mäyrä).

Geography

Neighboring municipalities are Hartola, Joutsa, Jyväskylä, Jämsä, Kuhmoinen and Sysmä.

There are all together 61 lakes in Luhanka. Biggest lakes in Luhanka are Päijänne, Tammijärvi-Hauha and Jutilanjärvi.

History 
Luhanka was first mentioned as a village within the Sysmä parish in 1462. The village gets its name from the lake Luhankjärvi or Luhankajärvi, the name of which comes from the word luha, a variant of luhta, a word which refers to a type of swamp. -nka is a derivational suffix, which is also found in other place names such as Puolanka and Maaninka.

It was granted a chapel in 1767 and became a separate parish in 1864. Due to the small population of the municipality, the parish of Luhanka became subordinate to the parish of Joutsa in 2006.

Notable people
Politician Hertta Kuusinen was born in Luhanka in 1904
Writer Kreetta Onkeli has spent childhood in Luhanka
Composer Toni Edelmann lived in Luhanka

References

External links
 
 Municipality of Luhanka – Official homepage 

 
Municipalities of Central Finland
Populated places established in 1864